Claros is a Spanish language topographic name, which is derived from claro, meaning a "clearing in a forest". The name may refer to:

Domingo José Claros Pérez de Guzmán, 13th Duke of Medina Sidonia (1691–1739)
Jorge Claros (born 1986), Honduran football player
Josep Clarós (born 1969), Spanish basketball coach
Juan Claros Pérez de Guzmán, 11th Duke of Medina Sidonia (1642–1713)

Other uses
Claros, Greece
Montes Claros, Brazil

References

Spanish-language surnames